A pig is a mammal of the genus Sus.

Pig, PIG, Pigs or PIGS may also refer to:

Animals
 Domestic pig, Sus scrofa domestica or Sus domestica
 Wild boar (wild pig or Eurasian wild boar), Sus scrofa, the species from which the domestic pig was bred
 Sus, a genus within the pig family, including Sus scrofa and closely related southeast Asian species
 Suinae, a pig subfamily, including Sus and other genera from Africa and southeast Asia
 Suidae, a family of animals, including Suinae and other extinct Old World subfamilies
 Suina, a suborder of mammals including Suidae, and the Tayssuidae (peccaries or "New World pigs")
 Guinea pig, a domestic species of rodent that is popular as a pet
 Hell pigs or terminator pigs, the Entelodonts, a family of extinct mammals

Places
 Pig, Kentucky, US
 Pine Island Glacier, a glacier of Antarctica

Arts, entertainment, and media

Films
 Pigs (1973 film), a horror film
 Pigs (1992 film) or Psy, a film by Wladyslaw Pasikowski
 Pig (1998 film), a 1998 film written by and starring Rozz Williams
 Pigs (2007 film), a film by Karl DiPelino
 Grisen (Danish "The Pig"), 2008 Danish short film with Jesper Asholt
 Pig (2010 film), a horror film by Adam Mason
 Pig (2011 film), a film written by Henry Barrial
 Pig (2018 film), an Iranian film
 Pig (2021 film), an American drama film starring Nicolas Cage

Games
 Pig (dice game), a dice game
 P-I-G, a variation of the basketball game H-O-R-S-E
 Pig, a variation of the card game Spoons

Literature
 Pig (novel), by Andrew Cowan
 "Pig" (short story), by Roald Dahl

Music

Albums and projects
 Pig (musical project), musical project by Raymond Watts
 Pigs (Asphalt Ballet album), 1993

Songs
 "Pig" (song), a 1998 song by the Dave Matthews Band
 "Pig", a song by Seether from Disclaimer II
 "PIG", an early demo version of "Mr. Jack" by System of a Down
 "Pig", a bonus song from Weezer Deluxe Edition 
 "Pigs (Three Different Ones)", a 1977 song by Pink Floyd
 "Pigs", a track on Cypress Hill, Cypress Hill's first album
 "Pigs", a song by Eyehategod from In the Name of Suffering
 "Pigs", a song by Tyler, the Creator from Wolf

Military
 Humber Pig, a British military vehicle
 General Dynamics F-111C, Royal Australian Air Force variant of the F-111 bomber nicknamed the pig
 M60 machine gun, nicknamed "the pig"
 Maiale (pig), a low speed human torpedo; see Midget submarine#Italy

Science and technology
 Apache Pig, a MapReduce programming tool used on Hadoop, language Pig Latin
 Pig, another term for ingot
 Pipeline inspection gauge, a form of pipeline maintenance used in pigging
 Pig, a small sandbag used for flood control inside a building
 PIGS (gene), a human gene
 Distillation pig, a piece of glassware that allows fractions to be collected without breaking vacuum
 Lead pig, a container made of lead shielding for storing and transporting radioactive materials
 The Pig (tool), a firefighting tool

Other uses
 Pig, a derogatory term for a police officer
 Pig (zodiac), a sign of the Chinese zodiac
 Pisabo language (ISO 639-3 code: pig)
 PIGS (economics), the economies of Portugal, Italy, Greece, Spain, and sometimes Ireland
 New Zealand DX class locomotive (DXR 8007 nicknamed "the pig")

See also
 Boar (disambiguation)
 Hog (disambiguation)
 Pigg (disambiguation)
 Piggy (disambiguation)
 Piglet (disambiguation) 
 Swine (disambiguation)
 
 

Animal common name disambiguation pages